The Adventures of Digger and Friends was a series of vignettes that showed during NASCAR on Fox pre-race shows in 2009; notably, the character of Digger would also make a brief cameo in that year's film Alvin and the Chipmunks: The Squeakquel; the character is briefly seen when a lead character's car zooms past him on a busy street, prompting him to joke "Feels like I'm back at the racetrack!".

Background 
In 2009, Fox Sports announced that "Digger", who had already been a mascot for the corner camera in NASCAR, would be subject to a series of vignettes that would air during NASCAR on Fox pre-races.

Keith Urban would compose and write a new single for the show, called "Lil' Digger". In an interview, Urban was noticeably happy with creating the song, saying "How could you turn the critter down? I immediately went to my drum machine, then to my guitar, back to my drum machine and on to my banjo and it wasn't long before I had the song. I just hope that Digger likes it."

An animation studio in Romania would animate the series.

Characters 

 Digger (Eric Bauza): A gopher obsessed with NASCAR racing. Frequently causes mischief at the racetrack, causing Lumpy to chase him.
 Annie (Haley Mancini): Digger's girlfriend.
 Marbles: Digger's friend.
 Gramps: Digger's grandpa and a fan of NASCAR since the beginnings of the sport.
 Lumpy Wheels: A security guard who constantly chases Digger for causing mischief at the track.

Premise 
The series follows Digger's life, and adventures in a racetrack with his friend, Marbles, his girlfriend, Annie, his grandpa, Gramps, and a police officer that chases Digger's mischievous acts, Lumpy Wheels, who was named after former Fox Sports president David Hill and former Charlotte Motor Speedway Humpy Wheeler.

Criticism 

After a NASCAR town hall-style meeting at the end of May 2009, Fox Sports chair David Hill reported receiving an email from a high-ranking NASCAR official whose identity he chose to conceal, stating that Digger could have been the cause of ratings declines for Fox's NASCAR coverage. Hill said "It was because of Digger that people were turning off in droves because they couldn't stand it, I said, I'm so sorry. If I'd known, I never would have created him. I didn't realize how insidious he was. It's the biggest crock of shit I've ever heard."

The criticism led to Fox Sports slowly phasing out the character in 2010; it was completely removed from their broadcasts by the time 2012 Subway Fresh Fit 500 aired.

Episodes

References 

Fox Broadcasting Company original programming
2009 American television series debuts
2000s American animated television series
American children's animated sports television series
American computer-animated television series
NASCAR on television
Fox Sports original programming
Animated television series about mammals